Queens Theatre, formerly Queens Theatre in the Park and before that Queens Playhouse, is an American professional theatre, located in Flushing Meadows–Corona Park, Queens, New York City, New York. Artistic and Executive Directors have included Joseph S. Kutrzeba, founder and producer; Robert Moss, Sue Lawless, Jeffrey Rosenstock and Ray Cullom, formerly Managing Director of Long Wharf Theatre in New Haven, CT, and currently, Taryn Sacramone, former Executive Director of Astoria Performing Arts Center.

History

Adapted from the former Theaterama at the 1964 New York World's Fair, the theater was part of Philip Johnson's then $6 million construction project that also included observation towers and an open-air pavilion called the "Tent of Tomorrow." The theater was originally decorated with the artwork of Andy Warhol and Robert Indiana. The site had also hosted the 1939 New York World's Fair.

The theater is next to the Unisphere at Flushing Meadows–Corona Park, an area that also includes Citi Field, the Queens Museum of Art, and the USTA Billie Jean King National Tennis Center.

Johnson and Richard Foster designed the original theater. The audience stood and viewed a travelog of New York State projected on screens lining the inside of the circular room. The showing of a cycloramic (360 degrees) film about New York State was a tribute to the world fair's host city.

The surround cinema was converted into a multipurpose "legitimate" theater in the 1970s, requiring the addition of a stage, public restrooms, lobby, dressing rooms, and stage house.

1972–1975
The Queens Playhouse, as it was called upon opening in 1972, was founded by Joseph S. Kutrzeba. In 1965, it was originally in a lumberyard in Bayside, Queens, and was the first nonprofit professional resident theater in Queens. In 1972, the theatre became live entertainment from previously being a movie theatre.  Their first production in the new theater was George Bernard Shaw's Pygmalion.  The theatre suffered financial setbacks in 1974, Kutrzeba blaming a lack of support by the New York State Council on the Arts and the Queens Cultural Association. In November 1974, Kutrzeba left Queens Theatre to pursue a career as a Broadway producer with The Lieutenant, a musical based on the trials resulting from the Mỹ Lai Massacre.  The production had started at the Queens Playhouse before it moved to Broadway where it was nominated for a Tony Award for Best Musical but closed after a short run.

1985–93 conversion
The circular theater closed in 1985. A $4 million project converted it into a 476-seat community theater, designed by architect Alfredo De Vido, opened in 1993. The conversion was a "wonderful success" according to Queens Borough President Claire Shulman, who said she was an attendee at the 1939 World's Fair (held at the same site) as a little girl.

It became known as the Queens Theatre in the Park. The theater is now used for cabaret, concerts, Broadway revivals, new productions, and film festivals. The playhouse hosts various drama, dance, music, performance art, troupe, and comedy performances as well as children’s events. The theater has been a venue for the Independent Film Showcase and is intended to meet the various interests of the diverse population of Queens.  The work completed in 1993 improved acoustics and added a public elevator, additional lighting and rigging, "front-of-house catwalks", and reworked the facades. The original dome was strengthened and a second roof added, abating noise from nearby LaGuardia Airport. A 100-seat "flexible studio theater" was also added in the downstairs "for more experimental fare".

In 1993 the famed Kitty Carlisle Hart was hostess at a Queens Theatre in the Park gala held at Terrace on the Park.
The operators of the theater became an independent nonprofit in 1997. A member of the Cultural Institutions Group, it is funded in part from the New York City Department of Cultural Affairs and hosts approximately 300 events a year.

During the 1996–97 season it had attendance of 90,000 people at more than 300 performances of theater, music, dance, children's shows and workshops, films and festivals. In an effort to reach Latinos, a Latin American festival was hosted. The 1964–1965 New York World's Fair New York State Pavilion was listed on the National Register of Historic Places in 2009.

2008–10 addition
A 2008–10 addition, designed by Caples Jefferson Architects with Lee/Timchula Architects, added a reception hall. A transparent circular pavilion, it is said to be "especially dramatic at twilight, when the sunset-colored, invert dome appears to hover and flow in the dark."

A 600-person "nebula" reception space was part of a restoration project completed in 2010. Architects involved included Caples Jefferson Architects.  This renovation was awarded the 2011 Architectural Lighting Light & Architecture Design Award.

In 2009, the theater was added to the National Register of Historic Places as one of the three qualifying structures that make up the New York State Pavilion from the 1964 New York World's Fair.

In popular culture
The exterior of the pavilion was used in the musical film The Wiz (1978), directed by Sidney Lumet; and the final scene of the science-fiction, action comedy film Men in Black (1997), directed by Barry Sonnenfeld.

See also

List of buildings, sites, and monuments in New York City

References

External links

 
 Queens Theatre at Architzer

1964 establishments in New York City
1964 New York World's Fair
Theatres completed in 1964
Flushing Meadows–Corona Park
Philip Johnson buildings
Theatres in Queens, New York
Regional theatre in the United States
Theatres in New York (state)